Das Vierte (English: The Fourth) was a German entertainment channel replaced in January 2014 by Disney Channel.

History
Das Vierte was launched by NBC Universal Global Networks (NUGN) in 2005 as an all-drama programming channel. The channel reached its 1% first-year goal with the expectations of doubling in two to three years. In 2008, NUGN sold the station to Mini Movie International Channel,  owned by Dmitri Lesnevsky, as the station was losing money. Lesnevsky expected to turn the station around through rebranding then reselling it.  In 2010, Phoenix Media planned to buy the station but that fell through. As of 2011, the station had a market share of 0.2%. In September 2012, The Walt Disney Company announced a deal to purchase Das Vierte. Disney closed on the deal by December 2012. In April 2013, Disney announced that Das Vierte would become a Disney Channel in January 2014. Disney closed the channel on 31 December 2013.

Programming
Das Vierte started with the slogan "Wir sind Hollywood" (We are Hollywood). The programming later moved away from Hollywood productions and towards a cooperation with the Anixe TV network.

Reality series

 Gene Simmons Family Jewels (Gene Simmons Family Jewels - Papa war ein Kiss) (2007-2009)
 Ghost Hunters (2009-2010)
 Ghost Hunters International (2009-2010)

Series

 7th Heaven (Eine himmlische Familie) (2008)
 Air America (2013)
 Airwolf (2006-2009)
 Alias (Alias - Die Agentin) (2009-2010)
 B.L. Stryker (2005-2006)
 Baywatch (Baywatch – Die Rettungsschwimmer von Malibu) (2007-2008)
 Beverly Hills, 90210 (2006)
 Charlie's Angels (Drei Engel für Charlie) (2007-2008)
 Ein Haus voller Töchter (2010-2013)
 Fat Actress (2007)
 Get Smart (Mini-Max) (2013)
 Hart to Hart (Hart aber herzlich) (2007-2009)
 Hawaii Five-O (Hawaii Fünf-Null) (2006)
 It Takes a Thief (Ihr Auftritt, Al Mundy) (2006-2007)
 Knight Rider (2005-2009)
 Law & Order (2006-2008)
 Magnum, P.I. (Magnum) (2006)
 Melrose Place (2006)
 Mickey Spillane's Mike Hammer (Mike Hammer) (2007)
 Murphy Brown (2013)
 Northern Exposure (Ausgerechnet Alaska) (2005–2006)
 Once and Again (Noch mal mit Gefühl) (2013)
 Quincy, M.E. (Quincy) (2005-2006)
 Remington Steele (2007-2009)
 Roswell (2009-2010)
 Sea Patrol (2011-2013)
 Simon & Simon (2005-2006)
 Starsky & Hutch (2007-2008)
 Tarzán (Tarzan) (2011-2013)
 The Bill Cosby Show (Bill Cosby) (2013)
 The Fall Guy (Ein Colt für alle Fälle) (2007-2009)
 The Persuaders! (Die 2) (2007–2010)
 The Professionals (Die Profis) (2007–2010)
 The Rockford Files (Detektiv Rockford – Anruf genügt) (2006–2008)
 The Saint (Simon Templar) (2007-2010)
 The Sullivans (Die Sullivans) (2013)
 The Time Tunnel (Time Tunnel) (2013)
 Unhappily Ever After (Auf schlimmer und ewig) (2013)
 Viper (2013)
 Zorro (Zorro - Der schwarze Rächer)'' (2011–2013)

Availability
Das Vierte was available via terrestrial transmission in Berlin and Bremen, as well as Europe wide on Astra digital satellite service.

Via the air waves, the station had an availability to 93% of German TV households.

Audience share

Germany

References

Defunct television channels in Germany
Television channels and stations established in 2005
Television channels and stations disestablished in 2013
2005 establishments in Germany
2013 disestablishments in Germany
Former subsidiaries of The Walt Disney Company